Vehicle registration plates of official road vehicles registered in Vatican City use the prefix SCV followed by a series of digits while vehicle registration plates of residential road vehicles registered in Vatican City use the prefix CV followed by a series of digits. The Pope's car carries the registration SCV 1 in red lettering and the rest of the cars that the Pope can be inside, also carry red letters.  

The international vehicle registration code for the Vatican City is V. Vatican registration plates does not incorporate this code. When driving outside of the Vatican, as a contracting party of the Geneva Convention on Road Traffic, the distinguishing sign of the country of registration must be displayed on the rear of the vehicle, in black letters on a white background having the shape of an ellipse.

Vehicle types

See also 
Transport in Vatican City

References 

Vatican City